P. poeppigii may refer to:

 Perezia poeppigii, a South American aster
 Polyachyrus poeppigii, a South American daisy
 Pseudogynoxys poeppigii, a Peruvian sunflower